Fausta Shakiwa Mosha (born 14 April 1976) is a Tanzanian senior Laboratory consultant for the United States Association of Public Health Laboratories of East Africa for East and South Africa regions. She has been the Director for the National Health Laboratory Quality Assurance and Training Centre for the Ministry of Health since 2011.

Early life and education
Born in Tanga, region, Tanzania, Mosha commenced her education at Tanga International School and later moved to Azimio Primary school, both in Tanga between the year 1982 and 1988. From the year 1989–1992, she went to Mbeya and Loleza Secondary Schools respectively and later on to Kilakala and Loleza High School where she graduated in 1995.
She obtained her MD from Muhimbili University College of Health Sciences, University of Dar es Salaam and Phd in 2014 from the Catholic University of Leuven, Belgium.

Career

Ministry of Health
She was offered the director's position for National Health Laboratory Quality Assurance and Training Centre (NHLQATC) at MoH, Tanzania in 2010 and in the same year, won an International project for 9 African countries and 11 countries in the Caribbean region.

NHL/QATC
Fausta worked at overseeing and improving service and delivery at NHLQATC. She co-authored several articles and medical journals and led collaborations between the CDC and the National health Laboratory in Tanzania.

Other projects
Fausta has managed and is still managing other international and national projects including the following:

She was Principal Investigator (PI) for the project “Proficiency Testing for HIV Rapid Tests, Biological Safety Cabinet Certification and Laboratory Quality Management System Strengthening in Tanzania, Uganda, Sierra leone, Cameroon, Angola, Lesotho, Ethiopia, Swaziland, Kenya and 11 Countries in the Caribbean Region, a project aimed at strengthening 9 African and 11 Caribbean Countries' laboratory capacities to support HIV Care and Treatment and was a Honorary Lecturer at Muhimbili University of Health and Allied Sciences.

In addition, she was CO-PI for HIV Population Impact Assessment, Tanzania, Project Manager for the East Africa Public Health Laboratory Networking Project (EAPHLNP). Managing a $30 Million Regional project on strengthening capacity to prepare and respond to regional (East Africa) outbreaks and a Principal Investigator for the CDC-MOH cooperative agreement on the Global Health Security Agenda (GHSA)

Fausta started doing private consulting in May 2017 and is also currently a Board Member for the African Society for Laboratory Medicine and Board member for International SLMTA (Strengthening Laboratory Management Towards Accreditation) Governance Board

Personal life
She is married to Prof. Eliangiringa Amos Kaale and together they have three children.

See also

References

Tanzanian women scientists
Tanzanian women
Living people
1976 births
People from Kilimanjaro Region